North Beach may refer to:

Places

Australia
North Beach, South Australia, a locality
North Beach, Western Australia, a suburb of Perth

South Africa
North Beach, Durban, about the residential area in central Durban
North Beach (Durban), about the beach proper

United States
North Beach, San Francisco, California
North Beach, Indian River County, Florida, a former census-designated place in Indian River County
North Beach, Miami Beach, the northern section of the city of Miami Beach, Florida
North Beach, Maryland, a town on the western shore of Chesapeake Bay, in Calvert County
North Beach, Oregon, an unincorporated community
North Beach, Corpus Christi, Texas, a neighborhood
North Beach, a community in Long Beach Township, New Jersey

Other uses
North Beach (album), a 2006 compilation jazz album by Vince Guaraldi
North Beach (film), a 2000 film co-directed by and starring Richard Speight, Jr.
North Beach, a former amusement park and beer garden in Queens, New York; it closed with Prohibition and is now part of LaGuardia Airport

See also
 Northern Beaches, area in the northern coastal suburbs of Sydney, New South Wales, Australia